Jerzy Mirosław Sadek (13 January 1942 – 4 November 2015) was a Polish footballer who played as a striker.

Career
Born in Radomsko, Sadek played for ŁKS Łódź, Sparta Rotterdam and Haarlem.

He also played for the Polish national team, scoring 6 goals in 18 appearances between 1965 and 1971.

Later life and death
He retired to Żyrardów, where he died.

References

1942 births
2015 deaths
Polish footballers
Poland international footballers
ŁKS Łódź players
Sparta Rotterdam players
HFC Haarlem players
Ekstraklasa players
Eredivisie players
Eerste Divisie players
Association football forwards
Polish expatriate footballers
Polish expatriate sportspeople in the Netherlands
Expatriate footballers in the Netherlands
People from Radomsko
Sportspeople from Łódź Voivodeship